Tyrwhitt Hall (pronounced "Tirrit") is a late medieval residence and a Grade II* Listed building in Barton-upon-Humber, North Lincolnshire.

History
The earliest phase of the building dates from at least the 15th century, with prominent extensions and alterations in the 17th and 18th centuries. It is named after the Tyrwhitt baronets who lived in the building in the 16th century. A blue plaque on its exterior records that Philip Pape, a sculptor, singer, and choirmaster, lived and worked in the house from 1960 to 1982.

A large ditched enclosure, encompassing the manor, was discovered during the excavation of the nearby St Peter's Church. It pre-dated the church and is tentatively dated to the 10th century, suggesting that there may have been an earlier structure on this site than the 15th century phases of the building so far identified.

References

15th-century establishments in England
Buildings and structures in Lincolnshire
Grade II* listed buildings in North Lincolnshire
Barton-upon-Humber